Police Complaints Authority (PCA) is a body that adjudicates allegations of improper or shoddy investigations, refusal to file FIRs, custodial torture and high-handedness against the police. But its recommendations are not binding upon the state government for action against errant police personnel. Seventeen States have established the PCAs through State Police Acts, while ten states have done this through executive orders with a long-term goal of the PCAs is changing the policing culture and making it thoroughly professional.

History
The Police Complaints Authority were to be established at the state and district levels following the judgement by the 2006 Supreme Court of India, in the Prakash Singh and Ors. v. Union of India and Ors. AIR 2006 SCC 1 Case, in response to the huge volume of complaints against the police and the endemic lack of accountability.

State Police Complaints Authority
State Police Complaints Authority makes recommendations to government for taking disciplinary action against erring police officers.

Assam Police Accountability Commission

BP Katakey is the Chairperson of this Assam Police Accountability Commission. In 2018, there were 288 public complaints on various counts against police personnel from across Assam including 143 of alleged police inaction or negligence.

Chandigarh Police Complaints Authority

In February 2020, inspector Baljeet Singh, former SHO of Mauli Jagran station was appointed as the in-charge of the Police Complaints Authority (PCA) in Chandigarh. There is also UT vigilance department in Chandigarh.

Delhi Police Complaints Authority

In February 2019, PCA is working under the chairmanship of Justice P S Teji (retd) and other members are Nutan Guha Biswas, IAS (retd), P Kamraj, IPS (retd) and Tinu Bajwa. Official e-mail for complaints is pca.delhi@nic.in/ and website is pca.delhigovt.nic.in.

Haryana Police Complaints Authority

Up to 2019, 681 complaints received by the authority with staff strength of three persons.

Jammu and Kashmir Police Complaints Authority

Ministry of Home Affairs may like to have one Police Complaints Authority for the Union Territory of Jammu & Kashmir and Union Territory of Ladakh keeping in view various aspects including single police force for both the UTs.

Karnataka Police Complaints Authority

Justice C R Kumaraswamy was appointed of chairperson of the Karnataka Police Complaints Authority. Public need to submit the complaint by contacting on phone number 08262 230403 or by mailing to dpcackm@karnataka.gov.in in case of complaints against deputy superintendent of police and police personnel of lower ranks and contacting on phone number 080 22386063 and visiting www.karnataka.gov.in/spca for complaints against the superintendent and officials of higher ranks.

Kerala Police complaints authority

In December 2018, Kerala Legislative Assembly, to overcome a 2017 HC verdict that the orders passed by the KPA chairperson or members without the quorum are invalid, passed the Kerala Police (Amendment) Bill 2018 enabling the PCA chairperson or one or more members, both in the state and district bodies, to dispose of petitions. Kerala Police complaints Authority's chairman is Justice V K Mohanan and it has no investigation wing to conduct probe into the complaints. The post of the Chief Investigation Officer (CIO) was sanctioned to investigate custodial violence in 2016, but no progress has been made. Despite three government notifications being published for the recruitment of a Chief Investigation Officer (CIO) of the State Police Complaints Authority (SPCA) in Kerala, the CIO has not been recruited so far, pointing to bureaucratic rigmarole and lack of clarity from the state Home Department in conducting recruitment to a position notified as far back in 2016. Among the three published notifications, the second and third notifications were published when the first and second notifications were prevailing, pointing to a disarray in the Home Department.

Maharashtra State Police Complaints Authority

Up till February 2020, authority received 1490 complaints against the police. In 2014, Government Resolution was issued to establish the State PCA. In March 2020, Bombay High Court Justice (retd) Shrihari P Davare was appointed the new chairperson of the Maharashtra State Police Complaints Authority and whereas in 2023 Ashish Shailesh Paswan as Civil Member of Maharashtra State Police Complaints Authority

Punjab Police Complaints Authority

In October 2019, Government cleared appointments to be made to the State Police Complaints Authority and Divisional Police Complaints Authorities under 'The Punjab Police Act, 2007,' approving the Punjab Police (Appointment of Chairperson and Members of Complaints Authorities), Rules, 2019. In January 2020, retired IAS officer (instead of retired judge) NS Kalsi was appointed as chairman of Police Complaints Authority (PCA) for three years from 8 applicants. As per Punjab state human rights commission records, from 1997 to August 2018, 54 per cent (1.44 lakh) of the total 2.63 lakh human rights violations complaints received by it were against police officials which included complaints of abuse of power, false implication in any case and unlawful detention.

Tamil Nadu Police Complaints Authority

In Tamil Nadu, a Government Order was issued on 14 November 2019 for the constitution of the State level as well as district level police complaints authorities in accordance with Chapter IV of the Tamil Nadu Police (Reforms) Act of 2013.

Telangana Police Complaints Authority

In February 2020, Telangana High Court bench directed the state government to frame rules and regulations pertaining to the constitution of SSC and PCA by March 6.

Criticism
Police Complaints Authorities are currently considered lame-duck institutions that lacks bite with the diluted provisions of the Authority. It is often criticised for delay in justice.

See also
List of cases of police brutality in India
Law enforcement in India
Indian Police Service
Police ranks and insignia of India
List of Indian police officers
Police Mitra scheme
Consumer Court
Banking Ombudsman Scheme (India)

References

External links
Police Complaints Authority Delhi website
Police Complaints Authority Goa website
Police Complaints Authority Diu website
Police Complaints Authority Chandigarh website
Police Complaints Authority Odisha website
Police Complaints Authority Gujarat website

Police misconduct in India
 
Indian police officers
Police ranks of India
Law enforcement in India
Indian women police officers